Vector Graphic, Inc., was an early microcomputer company founded in 1976, the same year as Apple Computer, during the pre-IBM PC era, along with the NorthStar Horizon, IMSAI, and MITS Altair.

History

The first product was a memory card for the S-100 bus. A full microcomputer using the Z80 microprocessor, the Vector 1, was introduced in 1977. There were several Vector Graphic models produced. The Vector 1+ had a floppy disk drive. The Vector Graphic 3 had a fixed keyboard housed anchoring a combined screen terminal and CPU case. The Vector Graphic 4 was a transitional 8-bit and 16-bit hybrid model.

Although primarily used with the CP/M operating system, the Vector 3 ran several others including OASIS, Micropolis Disk Operating System (MDOS), and Micropolis Z80 Operating System (MZOS).

Early Vector Graphic models used the Micropolis floppy disk controller and Micropolis floppy disk drives. Later models were designed with the integrated floppy drive-hard drive controller and used Tandon floppy drives. Almost all used unusual 100-track per inch 5 ¼-inch floppy drives and 16-sector hard sector media.  Some models included 8-inch floppy drives and hard disk drives.

Vector Graphic sales peaked in 1982, by which time the company was publicly traded, at $36 million. It faltered soon after due to several factors. The introduction of the IBM PC in August 1981 shifted the market and smaller players lost momentum. The Vector 4 was accidentally pre-announced in April 1982, the same month that founder and chief hardware designer Robert Harp left the company after a dispute with co-founder (and wife) Lore Harp over control of the company. The early announcement of the Vector 4, which had a separate keyboard tethered to the computer (as opposed to a combined keyboard and terminal) resulted in a sharp decrease in sales of the Vector 3 as customers delayed purchases up to six months until the new product was available. In addition, the company had decided to use the CP/M operating system in the Vector 4, which they considered a superior operating system than MDOS; management recognized the nature of their gamble, as IBM would move the market in a different direction if it elected to use the DOS operating system for their competing product, the IBM 8080. The gamble did not pay off, and by the end of 1984 Lore Harp was gone and venture capital investors took over.  By summer 1985 only three dozen employees remained, down from a peak of 425 workers in 1982. Ultimately, the Vector Graphic headquarters and assembly factory, across from a 17-person company (Amgen) and  next to the 101 freeway, was converted into a Home Depot store.  Chapter 11 bankruptcy followed in December 1985. A sought-for merger partner was not found and chapter 7 liquidation of remaining assets resulted in October 1987.

Vector Graphic computers had many innovations, such as the Flashwriter integrated video and keyboard controller. Vector Graphic was known for their Memorite word processing application.  When combined with the Flashwriter, the Vector Graphic Memorite software gave low-cost word processing capability, which had previously only been available with dedicated word processors.

As of 2007, Vector Graphic still had a small but active user community.

See also
 Corona Data Systems - founded in 1982 by Robert Harp

References

Further reading
 Vector Graphic S-100 Documentation and Tech Info. By Herbert R. Johnson
Inspection of Tandon TM100 designs for 96TPI vs 100TPI operation, By Herb Johnson
Micropolis/Vector Graphic S-100 FDC, S100 Computers

External links
old-computers.com
computersgh.com
retrotechnology.com
lagidesain.com

American companies established in 1976
American companies disestablished in 1987
Computer companies established in 1976
Computer companies disestablished in 1987
Defunct computer companies of the United States
Home computer hardware companies